The Flight 105 UFO sighting occurred on July 4, 1947 when three crew members aboard a United Airlines flight reported seeing multiple unidentified objects in the skies over the Pacific Northwest.   A week prior, private pilot Kenneth Arnold had reported seeing similar objects nearby -- a sighting that was followed by nearly 800 "copycat" reports during the summer of 1947.  Four days after the Flight 105 sighting, Roswell Army Air Field issued a press release stating that they had recovered a "flying disc";  that statement was quickly retracted after the crashed object was identified as a conventional weather balloon. The following month, on July 29, an air crew flying the same route also reported unidentified objects.  

The Flight 105 sighting was the first "flying disc" report from professional airline pilots.   As a result of the sighting, Flight 105's Captain Emil Smith and original saucer witness Kenneth Arnold began a collaborative investigation of additional disc reports, including the Maury Island hoax. 

The Air Force ultimately concluded that the sighting was attributable to "ordinary aircraft, balloons, birds, or pure illusion".

Background

The Kenneth Arnold UFO sighting occurred on June 24, 1947, when a private pilot claimed that he saw a string of nine, shiny unidentified flying objects flying past Mount Rainier at speeds estimated to exceed 1,200 miles an hour (1,932 km/hr). This was the first post-World War II sighting in the United States that garnered nationwide news coverage and is credited with being the first of the modern era of UFO sightings, including numerous reported sightings over the next two to three weeks. Arnold's description of the objects also led to the press quickly coining the terms "flying saucer" and "flying disc" as popular descriptive terms for UFOs.

Between June 24 and July 4, "flying discs" were reported across the country.

Sighting

At 8:04 pm (PST),  United Airlines Flight 105 took off in a DC-3 from Boise, Idaho, bound for Pendleton, Oregon.  In a sign of the times, on departure Boise tower jokingly suggested the crew "be on the lookout for 'flying saucers'".

During the flight,  co-pilot Ralph Stephens reported sighting an approaching light and turned on the DC-3's landing lights to alert on-coming aircraft.  Stephens and Captain Emil J. Smith then reportedly observed what Smith termed "four or five 'somethings'".  Smith described the objects as "smooth on the bottom and rough appearing on top", but they could not say whether they were "oval or saucer-like".  One object was reportedly larger than the rest.     The crew later witnessed what they interpreted as four additional objects.

While airborne, Flight 105 radioed a report of the sighting to the tower in Ontario, Oregon.  

The crew reportedly witnessed the objects for "45 miles" (or about 12 minutes) before they disappeared "in a burst of speed", though the crew could not say whether they vanished by outspeeding the DC-3 or by disintegrating.  Outside the cockpit, stewardess Marty Morrow reported seeing the objects.  According to Smith's account, the eight passengers on board had no view to witness objects which were mostly dead-ahead of the plane.

Aftermath
The following day, Smith's first-hand account of the sighting was published by various outlets nationwide, including United Press.   Writing in 1948, one journalist recalled: "no report shook the incredulous so much as the account of Captain Emil J. Smith, veteran airline pilot, and his crew...  Here was substance, something that seemed above flimsy reports. The whole affair reeked of humor, but the story of Captain Smith and his crew, like a very few other reports, suggested a deeper,
more authentic meaning running below the surface of the nation’s belly
laugh. These were reportedly competent men shaken by their own eyesight. There was a substantial evidence which grew in the atmosphere of mirth."

Smith and his co-pilot were photographed "comparing notes" with original saucer witness Kenneth Arnold.  Journalist Dave Johnson of the Idaho Statesman published an account recreating Flight 105's journey from Boise to Pendleton in a press plane, accompanied by Arnold.  Arnold reported being "vindicated" by Flight 105, telling press "Everybody can't be seeing things... I might doubt myself, but can't doubt such observers as Capt. E. J. Smith". On July 12, Smith and Arnold were interviewed by agents of the FBI.

Days after Smith's sighting, the Roswell Army Air Field told press they had  recovered a "flying disc". The following day, the Army identified the crashed object as a conventional weather balloon.  The following month, an entirely different crew, also piloting United Airlines Flight 105, reported witnessing UFOs.

Smith and Arnold continued their collaboration – in late July, the pair traveled to Seattle to investigate the Maury Island hoax, an alleged recovery of metal dropped by a flying disc.

Explanation and legacy
Air Materiel Command ultimately concluded that "since the sighting occurred at sunset, when illusory effect are most likely, the objects could have been ordinary aircraft, balloons, birds, or pure illusion." The Air Force would later point out the power of suggestion likely influenced observers during the craze.

Despite official explanations, the Flight 105 sighting was incorporated into UFO folklore and conspiracy theories.

References

UFO sightings in the United States
July 1947 events in the United States
1947 in Oregon
Aviation accidents and incidents in the United States in 1947
1947 flying disc craze